The 1957 Titleholders Championship was contested from March 14–17 at Augusta Country Club. It was the 18th edition of the Titleholders Championship.

This event was won by Patty Berg.

Final leaderboard

External links
St. Petersburg Times source

Titleholders Championship
Golf in Georgia (U.S. state)
Titleholders Championship
Titleholders Championship
Titleholders
Titleholders Championship
Women's sports in Georgia (U.S. state)